Church of the Dormition orthodox parish church (PCU) in Chortkiv of the Chortkiv urban hromada of the Chortkiv Raion of the Ternopil Oblast.

History 
The church was built in the 16th century. One of the oldest wooden religious buildings in Podolia. The temple has a three-part structure with a gable roof. In 1583 it was consecrated in honor of the Dormition of the Blessed Virgin Mary.

During the invasions of Turks and Tatars, the temple suffered a lot of damage. But faithful parishioners rebuilt it every time. During the Independence of Ukraine, the church was completely restored.

On August 28, 2003, the hromada celebrated the 420th anniversary of the temple.

He serves in the parish of at. Myron Karach.

Sources 
 м. Чортків. Храм Успіння Пресвятої Богородиці. Храми Української Православної Церкви Київського патріархату. Тернопільщина / Автор концепції Б. Куневич; головний редактор Я. Буяк; фото: О. Снітовський, І. Крочак, Е. Кислинський, В. Бурдяк, Тернопіль: ТОВ «Новий колір», 2012., s. 382.: іл., ISBN 978-966-2061-24-6. (ukr.)

Churches in Chortkiv